District 2 is a former urban district of Ho Chi Minh City, Vietnam. As of 2010, the district had a population of 140,621 and a total area of 50 km².

District 2 was merged with District 9 and Thủ Đức district to become Thu Duc City on December 9, 2020, by Standing Committee of the National Assembly's approval.

Administration
The district has 11 phường, or wards:

An Lợi Đông
An Khánh
An Phú
Bình An
Bình Khánh
Bình Trưng Đông
Bình Trưng Tây
Cát Lái
Thạnh Mỹ Lợi
Thảo Điền
Thủ Thiêm

Development

In the past, District 2 was one of the poorest parts of Ho Chi Minh City due to the separation by the Saigon River from the city center. However, it is now one of the prioritized areas for investment by the government of Ho Chi Minh City. The completion of Thủ Thiêm Bridge in 2008 and Thủ Thiêm Tunnel in 2011 were expected to support the development of the Thủ Thiêm New Urban Area. Thủ Thiêm Tunnel joins District 2 with District 1 (Central Sài Gòn), the central area of Ho Chi Minh City. The other connection of District 2 to the central city area is the Thủ Thiêm Bridge, which connects District 2 and Bình Thạnh district. The transportation to District 2 will be much easier when the metro, whose route passes through District 2, comes into use. This will be the first metro in Vietnam, and it will help Ho Chi Minh City to catch up with other developed cities in the world.

The Vietnamese government is seeking to build a completely new district for wealthy citizens as well as a new economic center. Thanh Niên and Tuổi Trẻ, two newspapers in Vietnam, describe that the new District 2 will be as modern as Singapore and Hong Kong.

Less prosperous agricultural workers of District 2 have been forced to move in slum clearance measures. Thatched houses will be replaced by multi-story houses and villas. A few single-family homes will be constructed for those with large incomes. A large number of citizens would go on living in high-grade apartment blocks. Each block contains swimming pools, tennis courts, shopping malls, and other necessary services. There will be kindergartens, elementary schools, and high schools, but there will be no university, as all the universities are being moved to Thủ Đức district to form the University Village, which is another plan of the city government. Beside the residential area will be the economic and trade zone with modern skyscrapers.

District 2, particularly Thảo Điền ward, has a large portion of Ho Chi Minh City's expatriate community, and as such has a large number of restaurants, bars and shops selling European foods, particularly the high street Xuân Thủy. This area is also home to many large apartment developments. Traffic has become a major problem in District 2 due to its proximity to several international schools and many residents who travel by private vehicle.

Education

District 2 is home to many international schools, partly because of the high number of foreign residents, and also because of its proximity to District 1. Below is a list of schools that are in this area:
 International School Ho Chi Minh City, 28 Võ Trường Toản Street
 British International School Vietnam has the An Phú Primary and An Phú Secondary campuses
 Australian International School, Vietnam, 264 Mai Chí Thọ Road
 EUROPEAN International School Ho Chi Minh City, 730 F-G-K, Lê Văn Miến Street, Thảo Điền ward
 Deutsche Schule HCMC – The International German School (IGS), 12 Võ Trường Toản Street, Thảo Điền ward
 EtonHouse International Pre-School Franchise - An Phu, Somerset Vista, 628c Hanoi Highway, An Phú ward
 The American School, 6 Song Hanh Road, An Phú ward

References

Former districts of Vietnam